Asher Fisch (Hebrew: אשר פיש) (born May 19, 1958, Jerusalem, Israel) is an Israeli conductor and pianist.

Fisch began his career as an assistant of Daniel Barenboim and an associate conductor of the Berlin State Opera. He made his United States debut in 1995, conducting Der fliegende Holländer at the Los Angeles Opera. He was chief conductor of the Vienna Volksoper from 1995 to 2000. He served as music director of Israeli Opera from 1998 to 2008. Seattle Opera named him its principal guest conductor in October 2007.

Fisch first guest-conducted the West Australian Symphony Orchestra (WASO) in 1999. In May 2012, WASO announced the appointment of Fisch as its next principal conductor, effective 1 January 2014, with an initial contract of 3 years.  In September 2015, the WASO announced the extension of Fisch's contract until the end of 2019. With the WASO, Fisch has recorded the symphonies of Brahms.

Selected discography 
 Wagner - Der Ring Des Nibelungen
 State Opera of South Australia: Melba Recordings - Das Rheingold (MR301089-90), Die Walküre (MR301091-94), Siegfried (MR301095-98), Götterdämmerung (MR301099-102)
 Seattle Opera: Avie AV2313
 Gordon Getty - The Little Match Girl. Nikolai Schukoff, Lester Lynch, Melody Moore, Asher Fisch, Ulf Schirmer, Münchner Rundfunkorchester, Chor des Bayerischen Rundfunks. PENTATONE PTC 5186480 (2015)

Awards and nominations

ARIA Music Awards
The ARIA Music Awards is an annual awards ceremony that recognises excellence, innovation, and achievement across all genres of Australian music. They commenced in 1987. 

! 
|-
| 2007 
| Wagner: Das Rheingold (with State Opera of South Australia & Adelaide Symphony Orchestra)
| Best Classical Album
| 
| 
|-

References

External links 
 Official Asher Fisch homepage
 Opus 3 Artists biography of Fisch
 The Israeli Opera Festival, "Opera in Israel – a Brief History"
 WASO page on Asher Fisch

Israeli conductors (music)
Helpmann Award winners
Living people
1958 births
People from Jerusalem
21st-century conductors (music)